The Tarumã Açu River is a river in the state of  Amazonas, Brazil.
It is a left tributary of the Rio Negro, which it enters just west of the city of Manaus.

Course

The Tarumã Açu River originates with a spring in the community of Nova Canaã, at kilometre 40 of the BR-174 highway.
It drains the east part of the Tarumã Açu – Tarumã Mirim section of the Rio Negro Left Bank Environmental Protection Area, which is mainly covered by dense rainforest but has areas of open tropical forest and campinarana.
The lower section of the river corresponds to the western boundary of the Manaus urban area.
Several of its left bank tributaries originate in the Adolfo Ducke Forest Reserve and cross the north and west zones of Manaus.
The urban area tributaries are the Igarapé Leão, Igarapé do Mariano, Igarapé do Bolívia, which originate in the Ducke reserve, and the Igarapé do Tarumãzinho, which is completely contained in the Bairro do Tarumã.

The Tarumã Açu and Tarumã Mirim are blackwater rivers, acidic and low in minerals.

See also
List of rivers of Amazonas

Notes

Sources

Rio Negro (Amazon)
Rivers of Amazonas (Brazilian state)